Lawrence Kahn or Larry Kahn may refer to:

Lawrence E. Kahn (born 1937), American judge
Lawrence M. Kahn (born 1950), American professor at Cornell
Larry Kahn (tiddlywinks) (born 1953/1954), American tiddlywinks champion
Larry Kahn, sports broadcaster for Sports USA Radio Network